The foreign-born population of the United Kingdom includes immigrants from a wide range of countries who are resident in the United Kingdom. In the period January to December 2016, there were groups from 22 foreign countries that were estimated to consist of at least 100,000 individuals residing in the UK (people born in Poland, India, Pakistan, the Republic of Ireland, Romania, Germany, Bangladesh, South Africa, China, Italy, Nigeria, Lithuania, the United States, France, Spain, the Philippines, Jamaica, Sri Lanka, Australia, Portugal, Kenya and Zimbabwe).

The foreign-born population increased from about 5.3 million in 2004 to nearly 9.3 million in 2018. In the decade leading up to 2018, the number of non-EU migrants outnumbered EU migrants while the number of EU migrants increased more rapidly. EU citizens were noted to be less likely to become British citizens than non-EU migrants.

Size of the foreign-born population

At the time of the UK census conducted in April 2001, 8.3 percent of the country's population were foreign-born. This was substantially less than that of major immigration countries such as Australia (23 percent), Canada (19.3 percent) and the USA (12.3 percent). In 2005, the foreign-born population was estimated at 9.1 percent, compared to a European Union average of 8.6 percent. The 2011 census recorded 7,337,139 foreign-born residents in England, corresponding to 13.8 percent of the population. The foreign-born population of Wales was recorded as 167,871 (5.5 percent), Scotland's as 369,284 (7 percent) and Northern Ireland's as 119,186 (6.6 percent), making the total foreign-born population of the UK 7,993,480. Figures for each census since 1951 are given in the table below.

A 2010 estimate for the whole of the UK shows that 4.76 million people (7.7 percent) were born outside the EU and 2.24 million (3.6 percent) were born in another EU member state.

The Office for National Statistics produces annual estimates of the size of the UK population by country of birth, based on the Annual Population Survey. The estimates for 2018 show that 9.3 million people (14 percent of the usual resident population) were born abroad.

In January 2021, analysis by the Economic Statistics Centre of Excellence suggested that there had been an "unprecedented exodus" of almost 1.3 million foreign-born people from the UK between July 2019 and September 2020, in part due to the burden of job losses resulting from the COVID-19 pandemic falling disproportionately on foreign-born workers. Interviews conducted by Al Jazeera suggested that Brexit may have been a more significant push factor than the pandemic. Subsequent analysis of the impact of the pandemic on population statistics generated by the Labour Force Survey (LFS) suggests that "LFS-based estimates are likely to significantly overstate the change in the non-UK national population". Payroll data shows that the number of EU workers fell by 7 percent between October–December 2019 and October–December 2020.

According to the Migration Observatory at the University of Oxford:

Year of arrival

Countries of origin
The table below lists the places of birth of UK residents according to the 2001 Census, as reported by the Organisation for Economic Co-operation and Development. The table also lists population estimates of the foreign-born population for the top 60 foreign countries of birth in the period January 2010 to December 2010, published by the Office for National Statistics.

In 2001, the five most common foreign countries of birth were the Republic of Ireland, India, Pakistan, Germany and the United States respectively. In 2010, the most common foreign countries of birth were India, Poland (up from 18th in 2001), Pakistan, the Republic of Ireland and Germany, respectively. While those born in Germany constitute one of the UK's largest foreign-born groups, many are British nationals who were born in Germany to British military personnel based there. The United States dropped to eighth place behind South Africa and Bangladesh, despite growth in the size of the U.S.-born population.

The period between 2001 and 2010 saw significant change in the UK's foreign-born population. In particular, the 2004 and 2007 enlargements of the European Union have led to mass migration from Poland, Bulgaria, Latvia, Romania, Slovakia and Lithuania. The number of Poland-born people resident in the UK increased from 60,711 in 2001 to an estimated 532,000 in the year to December 2010, whilst the population born in Lithuania increased from 4,363 to an estimated 87,000. The most significant decrease in a foreign-born population resident in the UK between 2001 and 2010 is in the number of those originating from the Republic of Ireland. Whilst 533,901 people born in the Republic of Ireland were resident in the UK in 2001, this is estimated to have declined to 405,000 by 2010.

Institute for Public Policy Research analysis
In 2005 the Institute for Public Policy Research published an analysis of data from the 2001 Census, revealing the number of people included in the census who were born outside the British Isles, where they lived, and comparing this information against the 1991 Census. The results were made available on the BBC website. Note that this data refers to Great Britain only, rather than the whole of the UK, because of the lack of digital boundaries in the census data for Northern Ireland.

See also
Modern immigration to the United Kingdom
MigrationWatch UK

References

External links
Beyond Black and White: Mapping new immigrant communities
Born Abroad: An immigration map of Britain

Demographics of the United Kingdom
Immigration to the United Kingdom